Luis Bernardo Martínez (born 31 January 1967) is a Spanish wrestler. He competed in the men's Greco-Roman 62 kg at the 1992 Summer Olympics.

References

1967 births
Living people
Spanish male sport wrestlers
Olympic wrestlers of Spain
Wrestlers at the 1992 Summer Olympics
Sportspeople from Asturias
20th-century Spanish people